Pyraustinae is a large subfamily of the lepidopteran family Crambidae, the crambid snout moths. It currently includes over 1,400 species; most of them tropical but some found in temperate regions including both North America and Europe.

The Pyraustinae were originally including the Spilomelinae; the present group was at that time considered a tribe Pyraustini. It has not been fully established yet which taxa of the Pyraustinae sensu lato belong to Pyraustinae as currently understood; thus the number of species in this subfamily is set to increase (although the Spilomelinae are the larger group of the old Pyraustinae).

Taxonomists' opinions differ as to the correct placement of the Crambidae, some authorities treating them as a subfamily (Crambinae) of the family Pyralidae. If this is done, Pyraustinae is usually treated as a separate subfamily within Pyralidae.

The Pyraustinae are characterised by atrophied spinula and venulae in the tympanal organs; a narrow fornix tympani; a longitudinal groove with androconial scales on the male mesothoracic tibiae; an often spinose antrum; and a sella (a medially directed clasper on the inside of the valvae), and an editum with modified setae on the male valvae.

Many species have larvae that bore into stems and fruit of plants, and several, notably from the genus Ostrinia, are serious agricultural pests.

Life cycle 
Life cycle of Saucrobotys futilalis

Pyraustinae taxonomy
Acellalis Pagenstecher, 1884
Achyra Guenée, 1849 (= Achiria Sherborn, 1932, Achyria Sherborn, 1932, Dosara Walker, 1859, Eurycreon Lederer, 1863, Tritaea Meyrick, 1884)
Acropentias Meyrick, 1890
Adoxobotys Munroe, 1978
Aeolosma Meyrick, 1938
Aglaops Warren, 1892 (= Xanthopsamma Munroe & Mutuura, 1968)
Ametrea Munroe, 1964
Anamalaia Munroe & Mutuura, 1969
Anania Hübner, 1823 (= Algedonia Lederer, 1863, Mutuuraia Munroe, 1976, Nealgedonia Munroe, 1976, Ametasia M. O. Martin, 1986, Ebulea Doubleday, 1849, Ennychia Treitschke, 1828, Ennichia Duponchel, 1833, Ethiobotys Maes, 1997, Eurrhypara Hübner, 1825, Palpita Hübner, 1806, Proteurrhypara Munroe & Mutuura, 1969, Opsibotys Warren, 1890, Perinephela Hübner, 1825, Perinephele Hübner, 1826, Perinephila Hampson, 1897, Phlyctaenia Hübner, 1825, Polyctaenia Hübner, 1826, Pronomis Munroe & Mutuura, 1968, Tenerobotys Munroe & Mutuura, 1971, Trichovalva Amsel, 1956, Udonomeiga Mutuura, 1954)
Ancyloptila Meyrick, 1889
Aplectropus Hampson in Walsingham & Hampson, 1896
Aponia Munroe, 1964
Arenochroa Munroe, 1976
Arunamalaia Rose & Kirti, 1987
Asphadastis Meyrick, 1934
Atomoclostis Meyrick, 1934
Aulacoptera Hampson, 1896 (= Aulacophora Swinhoe, 1895; preoccupied by Aulacophora Dejean, 1835)
Aurorobotys Munroe & Mutuura, 1971
Authaeretis Meyrick, 1886 (= Anthaeretis Carus, 1887)
Auxolophotis Meyrick, 1933
Betousa Walker, 1865 (= Neothyris Warren, 1899)
Burathema Walker, 1863
Calamochrous Lederer, 1863 (= Calamochrosta Lederer, 1863)
Callibotys Munroe & Mutuura, 1969
Carminibotys Munroe & Mutuura, 1971
Catapsephis Hampson, 1899
Ceuthobotys Munroe, 1978
Cheloterma Meyrick, 1933
Chilochroma Amsel, 1956
Chilocorsia Munroe, 1964
Chilopionea Munroe, 1964
Chobera Moore, 1888
Circobotys Butler, 1879
Clatrodes Marion & Viette, 1953
Coelobathra Turner, 1908
Coptobasoides Janse, 1935
Crocidophora Lederer, 1863 (= Crocidosema Lederer, 1863, Monocrocis Warren, 1895)
Crypsiptya Meyrick, 1894 (= Coclebotys Munroe & Mutuura, 1969)
Cryptosara E. L. Martin, 1956
Cybalobotys Maes, 2001
Cyclarcha Swinhoe, 1894
Daunabotys Maes, 2004
Decelia Snellen, 1880
Deltobotys Munroe, 1964
Demobotys Munroe & Mutuura, 1969
Drachma Bryk, 1913
Ecpyrrhorrhoe Hübner, 1825 (= Ecpyrrhorrhoa J. L. R. Agassiz, 1846, Ecpyrrhorrhoea Hübner, 1826, Harpadispar Agenjo, 1952, Pyraustegia Marion, 1963, Yezobotys Munroe & Mutuura, 1969)
Elosita Snellen, 1899
Emphylica Turner, 1913
Endographis Meyrick, 1894
Endotrichella Collins, 1962 (= Endotrichodes Hampson, 1919)
Ennomosia Amsel, 1956
Enyocera Snellen, 1880
Epicorsia Hübner, 1818 (= Episcorsia Hübner, 1826)
Epiecia Walker, 1866
Epiparbattia Caradja, 1925
Eretmopteryx Saalmüller, 1884
Erinothus Hampson, 1899
Euclasta Lederer, 1855 (= Ilurgia Walker, 1859, Proteuclasta Munroe, 1958)
Eumaragma Meyrick, 1933
Eumorphobotys Munroe & Mutuura, 1969
Euphyciodes Marion, 1954
Exeristis Meyrick, 1886
Fumibotys Munroe, 1976
Glaucoda Karsch, 1900
Glyphidomarptis Meyrick, 1936
Gnamptorhiza Warren, 1896
Gynenomis Munroe & Mutuura, 1968
Gyptitia Snellen, 1883
Hahncappsia Munroe, 1976
Helvibotys Munroe, 1976
Hutuna Whalley, 1962
Hyalea Guenée, 1854
Hyalobathra Meyrick, 1885 (= Leucocraspeda Warren, 1890)
Hyalorista Warren, 1892 (= Pyraustopsis Amsel, 1956)
Hyphercyna Sauber, 1899
Idiusia Warren, 1896
Ischnoscopa Meyrick, 1894
Isocentris Meyrick, 1887
Lampridia Snellen, 1880
Lamprophaia Caradja, 1925
Lepidoplaga Warren, 1895
Leptosophista Meyrick, 1938
Leucophotis Butler, 1886
Limbobotys Munroe & Mutuura, 1970
Lirabotys J. C. Shaffer & Munroe, 2007
Lotanga Moore, 1886
Loxoneptera Hampson, 1896
Loxostege Hübner, 1825 (= Boreophila Duponchel, 1845, Cosmocreon Warren, 1892, Leimonia Hübner, 1825, Limonia J. L. R. Agassiz, 1847, Margaritia Stephens, 1827, Parasitochroa Hannemann, 1964, Maroa Barnes & McDunnough, 1914, Meridiophila Marion, 1963, Polingia Barnes & McDunnough, 1914)
Lumenia de Joannis, 1929
Mabra Moore, 1885 (= Neurophruda Warren, 1896, Neophruda Hampson, 1897, Streptobela Turner, 1937)
Macrospectrodes Warren, 1896
Megatarsodes Marion, 1954
Metaprotus Hampson, 1899
Metasiodes Meyrick, 1894
Mimasarta Ragonot, 1894
Monocoptopera Hampson, 1899
Monodonta Kenrick, 1907
Munroeodes Amsel, 1957 (= Munroeia Amsel, 1954)
Nacoleiopsis Matsumura, 1925
Nascia J. Curtis, 1835
Neadeloides Klima, 1939 (= Adeloides Warren, 1892)
Neasarta Hampson, 1908
Neoepicorsia Munroe, 1964
Neohelvibotys Munroe, 1976
Nephelobotys Munroe & Mutuura, 1970
Nephelolychnis Meyrick, 1933
Nomis Motschulsky, 1861
Nymphulosis Amsel, 1959
Oenobotys Munroe, 1976
Oligocentris Hampson, 1896
Oronomis Munroe & Mutuura, 1968
Ostrinia Hübner, 1825 (= Eupolemarcha Meyrick, 1937, Micractis Warren, 1892, Zeaphagus Agenjo, 1952)
Pagyda Walker, 1859
Palepicorsia Maes, 1995
Paliga Moore, 1886 (= Eutectona Wang & Sung, 1980)
Paracentristis Meyrick, 1934
Paracorsia Marion, 1959
Paranomis Munroe & Mutuura, 1968
Paratalanta Meyrick, 1890 (= Microstega Meyrick, 1890)
Parbattia Moore, 1888
Paschiodes Hampson, 1913
Patissodes Hampson, 1919
Peribona Snellen, 1895 (= Radiorista Warren, 1896)
Perispasta Zeller, 1875
Pimelephila Tams, 1930
Pioneabathra J. C. Shaffer & Munroe, 2007
Placosaris Meyrick, 1897 (= Xanthelectris Meyrick, 1938)
Platytesis Hampson, 1919
Pleonectoides Hampson, 1891
Portentomorpha Amsel, 1956 (= Apoecetes Munroe, 1956)
Powysia Maes, 2006
Preneopogon Warren, 1896
Proconica Hampson, 1899
Prodasycnemis Warren, 1892
Prodelophanes Meyrick, 1937
Protepicorsia Munroe, 1964
Protinopalpa Strand, 1911
Prototyla Meyrick, 1933
Psammotis Hübner, 1825 (= Lemia Duponchel, 1845, Lemiodes Guenée, 1854, Psamotis Hübner, 1825)
Pseudepicorsia Munroe, 1964
Pseudopagyda Slamka, 2013
Pseudopolygrammodes Munroe & Mutuura, 1969
Pseudopyrausta Amsel, 1956
Ptiladarcha Meyrick, 1933
Pyralausta Hampson, 1913
Pyrasia M. O. Martin, 1986
Pyrausta Schrank, 1802 (= Aplographe Warren, 1892, Autocosmia Warren, 1892, Botys Latreille, 1802, Botis Swainson, [1821], Ostreophena Sodoffsky, 1837, Ostreophana Sodoffsky, 1837, Botis J. L. R. Agassiz, 1847, Heliaca Hübner, 1806, Cindaphia Lederer, 1863, Haematia Hübner, 1818, Heliaca Hübner, 1822, Heliaca Hübner, 1818, Heliaca Hübner, 1808, Herbula Guenée, 1854, Hyaloscia Dognin, 1908, Mardinia Amsel, 1952, Panstegia Hübner, 1825, Perilypa Hübner, 1825, Porphyritis Hübner, 1825, Proteroeca Meyrick, 1884, Pyrausta Hübner, 1825, Anthocrypta Warren, 1892, Pyraustes Billberg, 1820, Sciorista Warren, 1890, Rattana Rose & Pajni, 1979, Syllythria Hübner, 1825, Rhodaria Guenée, 1845, Synchromia Guenée, 1854, Tholeria Hübner, 1823, Trigonuncus Amsel, 1952)
Pyraustimorpha Kocak & Seven, 1995
Rhynchetria Klunder van Gijen, 1913
Rodaba Moore, 1888
Sarabotys Munroe, 1964
Saucrobotys Munroe, 1976
Sclerocona Meyrick, 1890
Semniomima Warren, 1892
Sericoplaga Warren, 1892
Sinibotys Munroe & Mutuura, 1969
Sitochroa Hübner, 1825 (= Spilodes Guenée, 1849)
Stenochora Warren, 1892
Tabidia Snellen, 1880
Tangla Swinhoe, 1900
Tasenia Snellen, 1901
Thivolleo Maes, 2006
Thliptoceras Warren in Swinhoe, 1890 (= Mimocomma Warren, 1895, Parudea Swinhoe, 1900, Polychorista Warren, 1896)
Thysanodesma Butler, 1889
Tipuliforma Kenrick, 1907
Tirsa J. F. G. Clarke, 1971
Togabotys Yamanaka, 1978
Toxobotys Munroe & Mutuura, 1968
Trichoceraea Sauber in Semper, 1902
Trigamozeucta Meyrick, 1937
Trithyris Lederer, 1863
Triuncidia Munroe, 1976
Uncobotyodes Kirti & Rose, 1990
Uresiphita Hübner, 1825 (= Mecyna Guenée, 1854, Uresiphoeta J. L. R. Agassiz, 1847)
Vittabotys Munroe & Mutuura, 1970
Xanthostege Munroe, 1976

Some Pyraloidea are still not unequivocally placed in a particular tribe or even family; among these, Tanaobela for example is sometimes assigned to the Pyraustinae.

Former genera
Aediodina Strand, 1919
Cavifrons Zeller, 1872
Cryptographis Lederer, 1863
Haplochytis Meyrick, 1933
Orocala Walker, 1866
Plantegumia Amsel, 1956, now in Glaphyriinae
Protinopalpella Strand, 1911

See also
 List of crambid genera

External links
 

 
Moth subfamilies
Taxa named by Edward Meyrick